Jussi Nuorela (born 11 August 1974) is a Finnish professional football coach and a former player. He is the manager of VPS in the Veikkausliiga.

Club career
Nuorela began his professional career with FC Haka in the Veikkausliiga. He spent one season in the Turkish Super Lig with Elazığspor. After the 2009 season he retired from professional football and started as a youth coach at FC Inter Turku.

International career
Nuorela has made 20 appearances for the full Finland national football team, his debut coming in a friendly match against Qatar on 25 January 1994.

Coaching career
On 18 June 2021, he was promoted to the position of the head coach of VPS in the second-tier Finnish Ykkönen. He led the club to the promotion to the top-level Veikkausliiga at the end of the 2021 season.

References

External links
 

1974 births
Living people
People from Valkeakoski
Finnish footballers
Finland international footballers
Association football defenders
Veikkausliiga players
Eredivisie players
Eerste Divisie players
Allsvenskan players
Süper Lig players
FC Haka players
FC Inter Turku players
Myllykosken Pallo −47 players
Turun Palloseura footballers
FC Groningen players
PEC Zwolle players
Silkeborg IF players
Malmö FF players
Elazığspor footballers
Fortuna Düsseldorf players
FC Vaduz players
Finnish expatriate footballers
Finnish expatriate sportspeople in Liechtenstein
Expatriate footballers in Liechtenstein
Finnish expatriate sportspeople in Turkey
Expatriate footballers in Turkey
Finnish expatriate sportspeople in the Netherlands
Expatriate footballers in the Netherlands
Finnish expatriate sportspeople in Germany
Expatriate footballers in Germany
Finnish expatriate sportspeople in Denmark
Expatriate men's footballers in Denmark
Finnish expatriate sportspeople in Sweden
Expatriate footballers in Sweden
Finnish football managers
Vaasan Palloseura managers
Sportspeople from Pirkanmaa